Martin Kupec (born February 15, 1988) is a Czech professional ice hockey player. He played with BK Mladá Boleslav in the Czech Extraliga during the 2010–11 Czech Extraliga season.

References

External links

1988 births
Living people
BK Mladá Boleslav players
Czech ice hockey forwards
Czech expatriate ice hockey players in Sweden
HC Karlovy Vary players
HC Berounští Medvědi players